The Sri Lanka Police Weeratha Padakkama ("Sri Lanka Police Police Gallantry Medal") is awarded to police officers in Sri Lanka for gallantry or brave performance of duty. It is awarded by the Inspector General of Police (IGP). The medal replaced the Ceylon Police Medal for Gallantry which was awarded until Ceylon became a Republic in 1972.

See also
 Awards and decorations of the Sri Lanka Police
 Colonial Police Medal

References

External links
Sri Lanka Police

Civil awards and decorations of Sri Lanka
Law enforcement awards and honors
Awards established in 1972